Yoshinaga is both a masculine Japanese given name and a Japanese surname.

Possible writings
Yoshinaga can be written using different combinations of kanji characters. Here are some examples:

義長, "justice, long"
義永, "justice, eternity"
佳長, "skilled, long"
佳永, "skilled, eternity"
善長, "virtuous, long"
善永, "virtuous, eternity"
吉長, "good luck, long"
吉永, "good luck, eternity"
良長, "good, long"
良永, "good, eternity"
恭長, "respectful, long"
嘉長, "excellent, long"
嘉永, "excellent, eternity"
能長, "capacity, long"
喜長, "rejoice, long"

The name can also be written in hiragana よしなが or katakana ヨシナガ.

Notable people with the given name Yoshinaga
Yoshinaga Ouchi (大内 義長, 1532–1557), 16th century Kyushu warrior
Yoshinaga Asano (浅野 幸長, 1576–1613), Japanese samurai and feudal lord of the late Sengoku and early Edo period
Yoshinaga Fujita (藤田 宜永, 1930–2020), award-winning novelist and screenwriter from Japan
Yoshinaga Matsudaira (松平 慶永, 1828–1890), the 14th head of Fukui Domain during the Late Tokugawa shogunate and politician of the Meiji era

Notable people with the surname Yoshinaga
Aiko Herzig-Yoshinaga (アイコ・ハージック・ヨシナガ, 1925–2018), American political activist who played a major role in the Japanese American redress movement
Fumi Yoshinaga (よしなが ふみ, born 1971), Japanese manga artist, known for her shōjo and shōnen-ai works
, Japanese speed skater
Nadao Yoshinaga (ナダオ・ヨシナガ, 1919–2009), Japanese-American politician
Sayuri Yoshinaga (吉永 小百合, born 1945), Japanese actress
, Japanese footballer

Fictional characters 
Miyuki Yoshinaga (吉永 みゆき), human guise of the Orchid Undead from Kamen Rider Blade

See also
Yoshinaga, Okayama, former town located in Wake District, Japan
Yoshinaga Station, train station in Bizen, Okayama Prefecture, Japan
Yoshinaga-san Chi no Gargoyle, a Japanese light novel series written by Sennendou Taguchi

Japanese-language surnames
Japanese masculine given names